The Italian Individual Speedway Championship is a Motorcycle speedway championship held each year to determine the Italian national champion. 

Armando Castagna holds the record number of victories with 13 and in 2022, his son Michele Paco Castagna won his third title.

Winners

See also
 Sport in Italy
 Italy national speedway team

References

Speedway competitions in Italy
National speedway championships